Brazen Arrows is the ninth studio album by Azalia Snail, released in 2001 by Dark Beloved Cloud.

Track listing

Personnel 
Adapted from Brazen Arrows liner notes.
 Azalia Snail – vocals, instruments, production

Release history

References 

2001 albums
Azalia Snail albums